RF(Arg-Phe)amide family 26 amino acid peptide, also known as P518, is a human protein.

The 26-amino acid RF-amide peptide, P518 functions as a high-affinity ligand of GPR103. Both GPR103 and P518 precursor mRNA exhibited highest expression in brain. The 43-amino acid  QRFP peptide, a longer form of the P518 peptide is necessary to exhibit full agonistic activity with GPR103. Intravenous administration QRFP caused release of aldosterone, suggesting that QRFP and GPR103 regulate adrenal function.

References

External links

Further reading